The European Broadcasting Union (EBU; , UER) is an alliance of public service media organisations whose countries are within the European Broadcasting Area or who are members of the Council of Europe. , it is made up of 112 member organizations from 54 countries, and 30 associate members from a further 19 countries. It was established in 1950, and had its administrative headquarters in Geneva and technical office in Brussels.

The EBU owns and operates the Eurovision and Euroradio telecommunications networks on which major television and radio broadcasts are distributed live to its members. It also operates the daily Eurovision news exchange in which members share breaking news footage.

In 2017, the EBU launched the Eurovision Social Newswire, an eyewitness and video verification service. Led by Head of Social Newsgathering, Derek Bowler, the service provides members of the EBU with verified and cleared-for-use newsworthy eyewitness media emerging on social media.

The EBU, in co-operation with its members, produces programmes and organizes events in which its members can participate, such as the Eurovision Song Contest, its best known production, or the Eurovision Debates between candidates for president of the European Commission for the 2014 and 2019 parliamentary elections. The Director-General is Noel Curran since 2017.

General description

EBU members are public service media (PSM) broadcasters whose output is made, financed, and controlled by the public, for the public. PSM broadcasters are often established by law but are non-partisan, independent and run for the benefit of society as a whole.

EBU members come from as far north as Iceland and as far south as Egypt, from Ireland in the west and Azerbaijan in the east, and almost every nation from geographical Europe in between. Associate Members are from countries and territories beyond Europe, such as Canada, Japan, India and China. Associate members from the United States include ABC, CBS, NBC, CPB, NPR, APM and the only individual station, Chicago-based classical music radio WFMT.

Membership is for media organisations whose countries are within the European Broadcasting Area, as defined by the International Telecommunication Union, or who are members of the Council of Europe.

Members benefit from:
Access to world-class content ranging from exclusive sports rights to exchanges for news, music and children's programs.
A voice in Brussels and on international platforms lobbying for PSM and ensuring the optimal legal and technical framework.
Opportunities for sharing, learning and collaborating through conferences, working groups, training, and dedicated advice and guidance.
A centre for learning and sharing new technology and innovation with a team of experts providing strategic advice and guidance.

The EBU's highest-profile production is the Eurovision Song Contest. The EBU also organises the Eurovision Dance Contest, the Junior Eurovision Song Contest, the Eurovision Young Dancers competition, and other competitions which are modeled along similar lines.

Radio collaborations include Euroclassic Notturno—an overnight classical music stream, produced by BBC Radio 3 and broadcast in the United Kingdom as Through the Night—and special theme days, such as the annual Christmas music relays from around Europe. The EBU is a member of the International Music Council.

Most EBU broadcasters have group deals to carry major sporting events including the FIFA World Cup and the inaugural European Championships. Another annually recurring event which is broadcast across Europe through the EBU is the Vienna New Year's Concert.

Eurovision Media Services is the business arm of the EBU and provides media services for many media organisations and sports federations around the world.

The theme music played before and after every EBU broadcast is Marc-Antoine Charpentier's Prelude to Te Deum. It is well known to Europeans as it is played before and after the Eurovision Song Contest and other important events.

History

The EBU was a successor to the International Broadcasting Union (IBU) that was founded in 1925 and had its administrative headquarters in Geneva and technical office in Brussels. It fostered programming exchanges between members and mediated technical disputes between members that were mostly concerned with frequency and interference issues. It was in effect taken over by Nazi Germany during the Second World War, and thereafter the Allies viewed it as a compromised organisation that they could not trust.

In the spring of 1946, representatives of the Soviet radio committee proposed forming a new organisation; however, at the same time preparations were being made for an inter-governmental "European Broadcasting Conference" in Copenhagen in 1948 to draw up a new plan for frequency use in the European Broadcasting Area. It was considered necessary to have an organisation that could implement the "Copenhagen Wavelength Plan" but there was disagreement among broadcasters and particularly a fear expressed by the BBC that a new association might be dominated by the USSR and its proposal to give each of its constituent states one vote. France proposed that it would have four votes with the inclusion of its North African colonies. The United Kingdom felt it would have little influence with just one vote.

On 27 June 1946, the alternative International Broadcasting Organisation (IBO) was founded with 26 members and without British participation. The following day the IBU met in General Assembly and an attempt was made to dissolve it but failed; though 18 of its 28 members left to join the IBO. For a period of time in the late 1940s both the IBU and IBO vied for the role of organising frequencies but Britain decided to be in involved in neither. The BBC attempted but failed to find suitable working arrangements with them. However, for practical purposes, the IBO rented the IBU technical centre in Brussels and employed its staff. The BBC then proposed a new solution based on the IBO changing its constitution so there will be only one member per International Telecommunication Union (ITU) country, thus ensuring a Western majority over the USSR and its satellite states. In August 1949 a meeting took place in Stresa, Italy but it resulted in disagreement between delegates on how to resolve the problems. One proposal was for the European Broadcasting Area to be replaced by one that would exclude Eastern Europe, the Levant and North Africa.

After Stresa, a consensus emerged among the Western Europeans to form a new organisation and the BBC proposed it be based in London. Meetings in Paris on 31 October and 1 November 1949 sealed the fate of the IBU and IBO, but it was decided not to allow West Germany to be a founder of the new organisation. On 13 February 1950 the European Broadcasting Union had its first meeting with 23 members from the ITU defined European Broadcasting Area at the Imperial Hotel in Torquay, England, United Kingdom. The first president was Ian Jacob of the BBC who remained at the helm for 10 years while its operation was largely dominated by the BBC due to its financial, technical and staff input. The most important difference between the EBU and its predecessors was that EBU membership was for broadcasters and not governments. Early delegates said EBU meetings were cordial and professional and very different from the abrupt tone of its predecessors. West Germany was admitted in 1951 and a working relationship forged with the USSR's Organisation for International Radio and TV (OIRT) which existed in parallel with the EBU until its merger on 1 January 1993.

In 1967, the first concert in the International Concert Season of the European Broadcasting Union was broadcast from the Queen Elizabeth Hall in London.

Technical activities
The objective of the EBU's technical activities is simply to assist EBU Members (see below) in this period of unprecedented technological changes. This includes the provision of technical information to Members via conferences and workshops, as well as in written form (such as the EBU Technical Review, and the EBU tech-i magazine).

The EBU also encourages active collaboration between its Members on the basis that they can freely share their knowledge and experience, thus achieving considerably more than individual Members could achieve by themselves. Much of this collaboration is achieved through Project Groups which study specific technical issues of common interest: for example, EBU Members have long been preparing for the revision of the 1961 Stockholm Plan.

The EBU places great emphasis on the use of open standards. Widespread use of open standards (such as MPEG-2, DAB, DVB, etc.) ensures interoperability between products from different vendors, as well as facilitating the exchange of programme material between EBU Members and promoting "horizontal markets" for the benefit of all consumers.

EBU Members and the EBU Technical Department have long played an important role in the development of many systems used in radio and television broadcasting, such as:
The AES/EBU digital audio interface, formally known as AES3;
Serial and parallel interfaces for digital video (ITU-R Recommendations 601 and 656);
RDS – the radio data system used on FM broadcasting.
The EBU Loudness Recommendation R 128 and 'EBU Mode' meters (EBU Tech 3341)

The EBU has also actively encouraged the development and implementation of:

Digital radio (DAB) through Eureka Project 147 and the WorldDAB Forum.
DVB (Digital Video Broadcasting) through the DVB Project and DigiTAG.
Digital radio in the bands currently used for AM broadcasting through DRM (Digital Radio Mondiale).
Standardisation of PVR systems through the TV-Anytime Forum.
Development of other content distribution networks on the internet through P2PTV; EBU Project Group D/P2P, from November 2007 to April 2008, with a trial of selected member channels, thanks to Octoshape's distribution platform. The EBU is also part of the European P2P-Next project.

Controversies

Greek state broadcaster (2013)
On 11 June 2013, the Greek government shut down the state broadcaster Hellenic Broadcasting Corporation (ERT) on short notice, citing government spending concerns related to the European debt crisis. In response, the EBU set up a makeshift studio the same day near the former ERT offices in Athens in order to continue providing EBU members with the news-gathering and broadcast relay services which had formerly been provided by ERT. The EBU put out a statement expressing its "profound dismay" at the shutdown, urging the Greek Prime Minister "to use all his powers to immediately reverse this decision" and offered the "advice, assistance and expertise necessary for ERT to be preserved". Starting on 4 May 2014, the new state broadcaster New Hellenic Radio, Internet and Television (NERIT) began nationwide transmissions, taking over ERT's vacant active membership slot in the EBU. On 11 June 2015, two years after ERT's closure, NERIT was renamed as Hellenic Broadcasting Corporation (ERT), which reopened with a comprehensive program in all radio stations (with nineteen regional, two world-range and five pan-Hellenic range radio stations) and three TV channels ERT1, ERT2 and ERT3.

Belarusian state broadcaster (2021)
The Belarusian Television and Radio Company (BTRC) has been accused of repressing its own employees, having fired more than 100 people since a wave of anti-Lukashenko protests in 2020 following alleged election fraud. Many of them have also been jailed. Many voices have been raised against the participation of Belarus and the BTRC in the otherwise unpolitical Eurovision Song Contest in 2021, the argument being that the EBU would make a political statement if it did endorse Belarus by essentially and silently saying that democracy is unimportant and so are basic human rights such as freedom of speech.

On 28 May 2021, the EBU suspended the BTRC's membership as they had been "particularly alarmed by the broadcast of interviews apparently obtained under duress". BTRC was given two weeks to respond before the suspension came into effect, but did not do so publicly. The broadcaster was completely expelled from the EBU on 1 July 2021 for a period of three years.

Russian state broadcasters (2022)
The three Russian members of the EBU, Channel One Russia, VGTRK, and Radio Dom Ostankino are all controlled by the Russian government. On 21 February 2022, the Russian government recognized the independence of the Donetsk and Luhansk People's Republics, disputed territories that are internationally recognized as part of Ukraine. Ukraine's public broadcaster Suspilne called on the EBU to terminate the membership of Channel One Russia and VGTRK, and to consider preventing Russia from participating in the Eurovision Song Contest 2022, citing the Russian government's use of both outlets to spread disinformation surrounding the Russo-Ukrainian war. Following the 2022 Russian invasion of Ukraine, several other public broadcasters joined UA:PBC in calling for Russia's exclusion from the 2022 Contest; Finland's Yle and Estonia's ERR stated that they would not send a representative if Russia was allowed to participate. After initially stating that both Russia and Ukraine would be allowed to compete, the EBU announced on 25 February 2022 that it would bar Russia from participating in the Contest.

The three Russian broadcasters announced, via a statement released by Russian state media, that they would withdraw from the EBU on 26 February, citing increased politicization of the organisation. The EBU released a statement saying that it was aware of the reports, but that it had not received any formal confirmation. On 1 March, a further statement from the EBU announced that it had suspended its Russian members from its governance structures. On 26 May, the EBU made effective the suspension of its Russian members indefinitely.

In 2023, an extensive investigation by the EBU Investigative Journalism Network uncovered proof of a Kremlin-sponsored initiative to take Ukrainian children from the war-torn country to Russia, a war crime under international law.

Members

The Member list , comprises the following 66 broadcasting companies from 54 countries.

Current members

Suspended members

Past members

Associate members

Any group or organisation from an International Telecommunication Union (ITU) member country, which provides a radio or television service outside of the European Broadcasting Area, is permitted to submit applications to the EBU for Associate Membership.

It is also noted by the EBU that any country that is granted Associate Member status does not gain access into Eurovision events with the notable exceptions of Australia, who have participated in the Eurovision Song Contest and the Junior Eurovision Song Contest since 2015, Canada in Eurovision Young Dancers between 1987 and 1989 and Kazakhstan, who have participated in Junior Eurovision since 2018, all of which were individually invited.

The list of Associate Members of EBU comprised the following 30 broadcasting companies from 19 countries .

Past associate members

The list of past associate members of EBU comprises the following 30 broadcasting companies from 19 countries and 1 autonomous territory.

Approved participant members
Any groups or organisations from a country with International Telecommunication Union (ITU) membership, which does not qualify for either the EBU's Active or Associate memberships, but still provide a broadcasting activity for the EBU, are granted a unique Approved Participants membership, which lasts approximately five years. An application for this status may be submitted to the EBU at any given time, providing an annual fee is paid.

The following seven EBU broadcast members had status as Approved Participants in May 2022.

The following members previously had status as Approved Participants.

Organised events
The EBU in co-operation with the respective host broadcaster organises competitions and events in which its members can participate if they wish to do so. These include:

Eurovision Song Contest

The Eurovision Song Contest is an annual international song competition between EBU members, that was first held in Lugano, Switzerland, on 24 May 1956. Seven countries participated – each submitting two songs, for a total of 14. This was the only contest in which more than one song per country was performed: since 1957, all contests have allowed one entry per country. The  was won by the host nation, Switzerland. The most recent host city was Turin, in Italy, where  won .

Let the Peoples Sing

Let the Peoples Sing is a biennial choir competition, the participants of which are chosen from radio recordings entered by EBU radio members. The final, encompassing three categories and around ten choirs, is offered as a live broadcast to all EBU members. The overall winner is awarded the Silver Rose Bowl.

Jeux sans frontières

Jeux sans frontières (or Games Without Borders) was a Europe-wide television game show. In its original conception, it was broadcast from 1965 to 1999 under the auspices of the EBU. The original series run ended in 1982 but was revived in 1988 with a different complexion of nations and was hosted by smaller broadcasters.

Eurovision Young Musicians

Eurovision Young Musicians is a competition for European musicians that are between the ages of 12 and 21 years old. It is organised by the EBU and is a member of EMCY. The first competition was held in Manchester, the United Kingdom on 11 May 1982.

The televised competition is held every two years, with some countries holding national heats. Since its foundation in 1982, the Eurovision Young Musicians competition has become one of the most important music competitions on an international level.

Eurovision Young Dancers

The Eurovision Young Dancers was a biennial dance showcase broadcast on television throughout Europe. The first competition was held in Reggio Emilia, Italy on 16 June 1985.

It uses a format similar to the Eurovision Song Contest, every country that is a member of the EBU has had the opportunity to send a dance act to compete for the title of "Eurovision Young Dancer". The competition is for solo dancers and all contestants must be between the ages of 16 and 21 years and not professionally engaged.

Euroclassic Notturno

Euroclassic Notturno is a six-hour sequence of classical music recordings assembled by BBC Radio from material supplied by members of the EBU and streamed back to those broadcasters by satellite for use in their overnight classical-music schedules. The recordings used are taken not from commercial CDs but from earlier (usually live) radio broadcasts.

Junior Eurovision Song Contest

Junior Eurovision Song Contest, is an annual international song competition, that was first held in Copenhagen, Denmark, on 15 November 2003. Sixteen countries participated – each submitting one song, for a total of 16 entries. The 2003 Contest was won by Croatia. The winner of the most recent contest, which took place in Yerevan, Armenia, is France.

Eurovision Dance Contest

The Eurovision Dance Contest (not to be confused with the Eurovision Young Dancers Competition) was an international dancing competition that was held for the first time in London, the United Kingdom on 1 September 2007. The competition was repeated in 2008 when it was held in Glasgow, United Kingdom, but has not been held since.

Eurovision Magic Circus Show

The Eurovision Magic Circus Show was an entertainment show organised by the EBU, which took place in 2010, 2011 and 2012 in Geneva. Children aged between 7–14 representing 8 countries within the EBU membership area, performed a variety of circus acts at the Geneva Christmas Circus. The main show was also accompanied by the Magic Circus Show Orchestra.

Eurovision Choir

The inaugural Eurovision Choir featuring non-professional choirs selected by EBU Members, took place on 22 July 2017 in Riga, hosted by the Latvian broadcaster Latvijas Televīzija (LTV). 9 countries took part in the first edition. Carmen Manet from Slovenia was the first winner.

European Sports Championships

The European Sports Championships is a multi-sport event involving some of the leading sports in Europe. The European Governing Bodies for athletics, aquatics, cycling, rowing, golf, gymnastics and triathlon, will coordinate their individual championships as part of the first edition in the summer of 2018, hosted by the cities of Berlin (already chosen as the host for the 2018 European Athletics Championships) and Glasgow (already chosen as the host for the 2018 European Aquatics Championships, and which will now also host the events of the other sports).

See also
African Union of Broadcasting
Asia-Pacific Broadcasting Union
Caribbean Broadcasting Union
Commonwealth Broadcasting Association
Commonwealth Press Union
Europe by Satellite
International Telecommunication Union
North American Broadcasters Association
Organización de Telecomunicaciones de Iberoamérica
Public Broadcasting System

Notes

References

External links

EBU website

 
1950 establishments in Europe
Organizations established in 1950
Organisations based in Geneva
Publicly funded broadcasters